The Tocumwal railway line (also known as the Shepparton line) is a  gauge railway line in Victoria, Australia. The line runs between the border town of Tocumwal in New South Wales to Southern Cross, Melbourne. The line is utilised by various passenger and freight trains serving the northern suburbs of Melbourne and northern regions of Victoria.

History 
The Melbourne and Essendon Railway Company opened the first section of the Tocumwal railway line from North Melbourne to Essendon in 1860.  Following its take over by the Victorian Government in 1867, the line was extended to Tallarook and Mangalore in 1872.

A line was built from Mangalore to Toolamba and Shepparton in 1880 and extended to Numurkah in 1881, Strathmerton in 1905 and connecting with the New South Wales Government Railways at Tocumwal at a break-of-gauge in 1908.

Passenger services to Tocumwal ended on 8 November 1975 with the last train operated by T class diesel locomotive T324 and passenger carriages 3AS - 31BE - 2AE - 22CE. Before this time the Strathmerton - Cobram section was operated as the 'branch line' with a 102hp Walker railmotor connecting with the main line train. A bus service was then introduced for the Tocumwal branch, connecting with the Cobram service. By 1977/78 the service between Cobram and Tocumwal was being operated by a VicRail owned station wagon driven by the Cobram station master.

The last passenger service from Toolamba station to Echuca ran on 2 March 1981 with Y class diesel locomotive Y161, an ABE carriage and a C van. This consist had only been introduced a few months prior, with a DERM usually being rostered. Toolamba finally closed as a station on 20 December 1987.

The passenger service from Numurkah north to Cobram was withdrawn on 24 April 1981 but was restored on 14 August 1983. The service from Melbourne to Shepparton then to Cobram was again withdrawn on 21 August 1993, with Hoys Roadlines taking control of the train as far as Shepparton from 22 August, hiring locomotives, carriages and train crews from V/Line. This arrangement remained until 2004.

There have been calls for the line to be standardised as part of the proposed Melbourne to Brisbane 'Inland Railway'. In April 2008 it was announced that the Shepparton – Tocumwal section of the line would also be upgraded, as part of the Victorian core grain network in a A$23.7 million package with 6 other lines.

On 20 February 2020, a NSW TrainLink XPT passenger train on the adjacent North East railway line towards Sydney derailed at Wallan, resulting in suspension of freight, V/Line and NSW TrainLink services on the North East and Tocumwal railway lines. V/Line services resumed on 1 and 2 March 2020.

On 31 October 2022, after a week long delay due to extensive major flooding in the Goulburn Valley region, VLocity trains started running from Seymour-Shepparton for the first time, replacing the previous N and H set locomotive hauled services.

Branch lines 
A branch line was subsequently built from Murchison East to Rushworth and Colbinabbin, with another branch from Rushworth to Stanhope and Girgarre. A cross-country line between Toolamba and Echuca was completed in 1887.

A short branch line was opened from Shepparton to Dookie in 1888. A tramway, built and operated by the Shire of Tungamah, was opened between Dookie and Katamatite in 1890. It was taken over by the Victorian Railways in 1896. Another short branch line was opened from Strathmerton to Cobram in 1888.

Current freight train operations are as-required grain trains operated by Pacific National and Southern Shorthaul Railroad. In addition to these, Pacific National also operates a thrice weekly container service from Tocumwal to Appleton Dock.

Passenger services 
Craigieburn passenger services operate on the line within the Melbourne region between Craigieburn and Southern Cross. Upfield line services also utilise a small section of the line between North Melbourne and Southern Cross. Regional services from Seymour (as the Seymour line) and Shepparton also operate to Southern Cross, skipping most metropolitan stations. The line between Tocumwal and Shepparton is no longer served by passenger services.

Shepparton services 

V/Line operates five return services between Shepparton and Melbourne's Southern Cross Station on weekdays, with 3 return services running on Saturdays & Sundays.

Services generally stop at all stations between Shepparton and Donnybrook in both directions, with some services not stopping at Donnybrook, Heathcote Junction and Tallarook. Within the metropolitan network, limited services make stops at Essendon and North Melbourne on weekdays, while all services stop at Broadmeadows. At these stations, Shepparton-bound services only pick up passengers and Southern Cross-bound services only drop off. No services stop at any other station served by a metropolitan service.

References

External links 

 http://www.vline.com.au
 Official map
 Statistics and detailed schematic map at the vicsig enthusiast website

Railway lines in Victoria (Australia)
V/Line rail services
Railway lines opened in 1860
5 ft 3 in gauge railways in Australia
Shepparton
Public transport routes in the City of Melbourne (LGA)
Transport in the City of Hume
Transport in the City of Whittlesea
1860 establishments in Australia